Jungle Lord is a 1981 pinball machine designed by Barry Oursler and produced by Williams Pinball.  It features a Tarzan influenced theme, a multi-level playfield and a magnetic ball saver ("Magna Save"). Williams had introduced Magna Save in the Black Knight pinball game in 1980; Jungle Lord was one of four further Magna Save games produced in 1981, along with Pharaoh, Solar Fire and Grand Lizard. One difference from the Black Knight design was that Jungle Lord incorporated a "self-contained mini bagatelle style 'chamber' playfield, found on the top left-hand corner."

Jungle Lord also included an innovative scoring feature called Double Trouble, a drop target feature that engages when the player hits five special targets.

Description
Jungle Lord was the second of the four two-level System 7 games that Williams produced, the others being Black Knight, Pharaoh and Solar Fire.

The early production of the game had a red cabinet, and around 100 units were made. The later ones had a blue cabinet and the tiger artwork was slightly changed.

Gallery

Design team
 Concept: Ed Krynski
 Game Design: Barry Oursler
 Mechanics: Ed Krynski
 Programming: Larry DeMar, Paul Dussault
 Artwork: Constantino Mitchell
 Animation: Ed Krynski

Game quotes
 "Beat tiger, beat Jungle Lord"
 "Fight tiger again!"
 "Can you fight the jungle?"
 "Fight jungle tiger and win!"
 "Jungle Lord in Double Trouble."
 "You win. Fight in jungle again!"
 "Me Jungle Lord."
 "You Jungle Lord."
 "Me tiger and me Jungle Lord."

References

External links

1981 pinball machines
Williams pinball machines
Works based on Tarzan